Pauli Kaʻōleiokū (abt 1767–1818) was a Prince of Hawaii.

Early childhood
Pauli Kaʻōleiokū was born in 1767. His mother was High Chiefess Kānekapōlei, a wife of Kalaniʻōpuʻu. His paternity is a matter of some debate. However, it is known that Pauli Kaōleiokū was an ali'i po'olua. Both Kalaniʻōpuʻu and Kamehameha accepted him as their own son. A dispute is not suggested by this from Hawaiian tradition as po'olua was a common and formally acknowledged, chiefly acceptance that enhanced the offspring's lineage. He was admitted into manhood by the traditional awa ceremony around 1778. Shortly after that, he was among the first to meet Captain Cook when he came to the islands. He was known to be an expert spear thrower because of his ability to predict where a moving target would go to.

Battle of Mokuʻōhai

In 1782 Kamehameha I won his first decisive victory towards conquering the islands. King Kalaniʻopuʻu had died a year before leaving his son Kiwalaʻo  to rule in his place. Keōua Kūahuula was left nothing by his father after his death. Enraged by this, Keōua made several provocative moves to insult the new ruler and would become Kamehameha's chief rival during the battle that would ensue. Kamehameha received encouragement and the backing of several prominent figures instead of the new King. Kaōleiokū was Keōua's half-brother and supported him in the battle and afterwards, escaped with him to Kaʻū.

Keōua was convinced by twins Kamanawa and Kameʻeiamoku to travel with them when summoned to Kawaihae by Kamehameha. Kaʻōleiokū was among the formal entourage. Keōua was resigned to a probable fate and surrounded himself with his selection of chiefs to die with in his own canoe. Others were ordered to accompany Kaōleiokū. As they came to shore to greet Kamehameha, Keeaumoku Pāpaiahiahi stood from a distance with his men and threw a spear at Keōua, who, after a small fight, was killed.

Kaōleiokū was saved by command of Kamehameha I, who did not intervene during the struggle moments before. Another popular version of this event states that Kamehameha's brother, Keliimaikai had attempted to intercede for Keōua but failed and when Kaōleiokū's group made shore, Keliimaikai demanded that Kamehameha kill the young man and his group stating: "You have killed my Hanai, and I will now kill yours". To which Kamehameha replied: "He shall not die: he is the child of my youth." After that, he was taken into Kamehameha's court and traveled to Oahu where he fought problematic Russians around 1816.

Family and legacy

He was the father of four children, Kalanipauahi, Hānuna, Keolaloa and Kōnia. Keōuawahine was the mother of Kalanipauahi and Hānuna, and Kahailiōpua Luahine was the mother of Kōnia and Keolaloa.

He died February 19, 1818, supposedly, by means of akua hānai, being secretly fed the scrapings of the wooden images of the poison gods, or the kālaipāhoa gods.

He was a grandfather of Keʻelikōlani and Bernice Pauahi Bishop.

Family tree

References

1767 births
1818 deaths
Illegitimate children of Hawaiian monarchs
Royalty of the Hawaiian Kingdom
Burials at the Royal Mausoleum (Mauna ʻAla)